Janez Pavčič (born 18 October 1928) is a Slovenian cross-country skier. He competed in the men's 15 kilometre event at the 1956 Winter Olympics.

References

1928 births
Living people
Slovenian male cross-country skiers
Olympic cross-country skiers of Yugoslavia
Cross-country skiers at the 1956 Winter Olympics
Skiers from Ljubljana